Gary DeLong is an American former soccer goalkeeper.

In 1958, DeLong graduated from Balboa High School in San Francisco, California where he was a 1958 All State/San Francisco Section soccer player.  He is a member of the San Francisco Prep Hall of Fame.  In 1968, he played nine games for the Vancouver Royals of the North American Soccer League.  That year, he also earned six caps with the U.S. national team.  His first game came in a 3-3 tie with Israel on September 15, 1968.  He was also in goal for the 4-0 loss to Israel ten days later. He played three 1970 FIFA World Cup qualification games that year, a loss to Canada on October 17 and two victories over Bermuda on November 2 and 10.

References

External links
 Gary DeLong at NASLsoccer.blogspot.com
 
 Gary DeLong at NASLsjerseys.com

American soccer players
American expatriate sportspeople in Canada
United States men's international soccer players
North American Soccer League (1968–1984) players
Vancouver Royals players
Expatriate soccer players in Canada
Year of birth missing (living people)
Living people
Association football goalkeepers